USS Mason (DDG-87) is an  in the United States Navy. She is named in honor of the non-segregated crew serving on board . This ship is the 37th destroyer of her class. USS Mason was the 21st ship of this class to be built at Bath Iron Works in Bath, Maine, and construction began on 19 January 2000. She was launched and christened on 23 June 2001. On 12 April 2003, a commissioning ceremony was held at Port Canaveral, Florida. She is currently homeported in Mayport, Florida.

Etymology

This is the third U.S. Navy warship with the name USS Mason. The first , in service from 1920 to 1941, was named for John Young Mason, well known for his service as the Secretary of the Navy for two American Presidents. The second  was named for Ensign Newton Henry Mason, a Naval Aviator who was posthumously awarded the Distinguished Flying Cross. This ship is named for the crew of the second  as this was the first ship in the US Navy with this distinction of a predominantly black crew.

Service history
USS Mason conducted her maiden deployment with the  Carrier Strike Group in support of Operation Iraqi Freedom/Operation Enduring Freedom in late 2004. Mason returned home after six months on 18 April 2005.

On 3 October 2006, Mason departed Naval Station Norfolk for a seven-month deployment to the Persian Gulf in support of the Global War on Terrorism. She participated in Exercise Neon Falcon. Mason returned home in May 2007.

Mason deployed with the aircraft carrier  on 12 September 2008 for a scheduled deployment.

On 12 March 2011, she sailed through the Suez Canal en route to the Mediterranean, to support possible humanitarian or military action in response to the Libyan Civil War. In April 2011, a boarding team from the ship successfully liberated five Yemeni hostages from eleven Somali pirates who had taken over the Yemeni-flagged ship . The pirates had seriously injured two other fishermen in their attack, left the wounded ashore, and then taken Nasri to sea as a pirate mothership. Assault weapons, ammunition, rocket propelled grenades, and launchers were destroyed by the boarding team.

On 22 July 2013, she deployed to the 5th and 6th Fleet area of responsibility as part of the Harry S. Truman Carrier Strike Group. Mason returned to her homeport on 18 April 2014.

On 7 November 2015, Mason, acting as the flagship for Destroyer Squadron 26, completed the first East Coast Passing Exercise with the People's Republic of China's People's Liberation Army-Navy [PLA(N)] ships and U.S. Navy warships.

On 23 May 2017, Mason was awarded the 2016 Battenberg Cup, signifying she was the best all-around ship or submarine in the United States Navy's Atlantic Fleet based on crew achievements. Mason was only the fifth destroyer in the last 111 years to receive the award.

On 22 August 2022, Mason completed a homeport shift to Naval Station Mayport.

Attacks off the coast of Yemen
According to an unnamed U.S. Department of Defense official, the purpose for sending the ships was "to ensure that shipping continues unimpeded in the strait and the vicinity."

On 9 October 2016, Mason, operating near the Bab-el-Mandeb strait, was targeted by two missiles fired from Houthi-controlled territory. Both missiles fell short and crashed into the water. The Houthi insurgency denied launching the attack on the warship. The United States Naval Institute reported that Mason fired two SM-2 Standard missiles and one RIM-162 ESSM missile to intercept the two missiles as well as deploying her Nulka missile decoy. One of two U.S. defense officials cited anonymously added that it was not clear whether the incoming missiles had been shot down or crashed into the water on their own. This marked the first recorded instance of ship-based anti-air missiles being fired from vertical launching cells in combat in response to an actual inbound missile threat.

On 12 October 2016 Mason was again targeted by missiles fired from Yemeni territory while operating in the Bab el-Mandeb strait. Mason was not hit by the two missiles, which were fired from near the city of Al Hudaydah. On 13 October 2016, the U.S. attacked three radar sites in Houthi-held territory which had been involved in the earlier missile attacks with cruise missiles launched from Nitze. The Pentagon assessed that all three sites were destroyed.

On 15 October 2016, Mason was targeted in a third attack by five anti-ship cruise missiles while operating in the Red Sea north of the Bab el-Mandeb strait. The Navy Times reported the Mason fired a radar decoy, an infrared decoy, and several SM-2 Standard missiles in response, either neutralizing or intercepting four of the five incoming missiles. The Navy reported the fifth incoming missile as neutralized by a radar decoy launched from Nitze, after Mason alerted her to the threat.

Coat of arms

Shield 
The shield has background of white with a double chevron across the center. Above are opposing lions and below is a gold trident.

The traditional U.S. Navy colors were chosen for the shield because dark blue and gold represents the sea and excellence respectively. The United States representing colors, red, white and blue, are all represented. The double chevron is to honor DD 191 and DE 529, the former ships named USS Mason. The facing lions are adapted from the Mason family Coat of Arms, denote the Atlantic and Pacific campaigns of World War II. The trident, symbol of sea prowess, represents Mason’s modern warfare capabilities which include; AEGIS weapon system, Cooperative Engagement Capability, and Theater Ballistic Missile Defense.

Crest 
The crest consists of a helm, crossing swords behind and a combined anchor and cross surrounded by a wreath.The helm is symbolic to strong defense with power projection. The anchor refers to the namesake of DD 191, John Young Mason, who was the Secretary of the Navy under President John Tyler and James K. Polk. The cross is in reference to Newton Henry Mason's Distinguished Flying Cross award. The wreath represents all the awards, honors and achievements of the past ships with the namesake Mason and crews who served them.

Motto 
The motto is written on a scroll of white with a red trim.The ships motto is "Proudly We Serve". The motto is in honor of the high achievement of the African American crew of DE-529 who made history with their selfless bravery in defense of the U.S. in World War II and also marks their contribution to the eventual desegregation of the U.S. Navy.

Seal 
The coat of arms in full color as in the blazon, upon a white background enclosed within a dark blue oval border edged on the outside with a gold rope and bearing the inscription "USS Mason" at the top and "DDG 87" in the base all gold.

Awards 
 Combat Action Ribbon - (9-15 Oct 2016)
 Navy Unit Commendation - (Oct 2006-May 2007, Sep 2008-Apr 2009)
 Navy Meritorious Unit Commendation - (Jan 2011-Nov 2012)
 Navy E Ribbon - (2004, 2005, 2016)
 Navy Expeditionary Medal - (Sep-Nov 2013)
Battenberg Cup - (2016)

References

Further reading

External links
Official site

 

Arleigh Burke-class destroyers
Destroyers of the United States
Ships built in Bath, Maine
2001 ships
Carrier Strike Group Two